Ivaylo Lyudmilov Chochev (born 18 February 1993) is a Bulgarian footballer who plays as a midfielder for the First League side CSKA 1948 and the Bulgarian national team.

Career

Early career
Born in Pleven, Chochev began his career with local club Spartak Pleven, before moving to Chavdar Etropole in 2008.

CSKA Sofia
On 16 January 2013, Chochev joined A Group club CSKA Sofia. He made his debut in a 2–0 home win against Chernomorets Burgas on 10 March 2013.

Chochev swiftly became a regular starter. During 2013–14 season he established himself as a key member of the team. On 12 February 2014, it was officially announced that Chochev had signed a new three-year contract and doubled his previous salary.

Palermo
On 11 July 2014, Chochev moved to Serie A club Palermo, signing a three-year contract. Monaco and Wolfsburg were also keen on signing him but were not able to come to an agreement in time. Chochev scored his first goal for Palermo on 8 August, netting the tenth in a 12–0 pre-season friendly win over Calciochiese. He made his Serie A debut on 5 October against Empoli, coming on for the last 18 minutes in place of Franco Vázquez as Palermo lost 1–0 at Stadio Carlo Castellani. On 19 October, Chochev started for first time, playing 66 minutes in a 2–1 home win over Cesena. He scored his first Serie A goal on 12 April 2015, in a 3–1 away win over Udinese at Stadio Friuli. A week later on 19 April 2015, he scored another two goals against Genoa in a 2–1 home victory. His outstanding performances, both against Udinese and Genoa, saw him being named Man of the Match twice. On 22 June 2015, Chochev signed a new five-year contract.

On 25 September 2017, he provided two assists in a 2–1 home win over Pro Vercelli. He scored his first league goal of the season and received the man of the match award in a 2–2 away draw against Pescara on 3 November. He scored a volley from outside the box on 19 May 2018, in the last match of the regular season against Salernitana, in a 0-2 away win.

Pescara
In June 2019 Chochev joined Pescara, but never played because of his long recovery process from an injury he sustained in March 2019.

CSKA 1948
In the summer of 2020, Chochev returned to Bulgaria to sign with the newly promoted to First League team CSKA 1948. He returned in play on 18 October 2020, more than an year and a half after his injury.

International career
Chochev made his debut with the Under 21 national team during the Under-21 European Championship qualifying category in 2013.

He was called up to the senior national team for a friendly against Canada on 23 May 2014. He made his debut with the national team on 8 June 2015 in a 4–0 friendly loss against Turkey. He made his first start playing the full 90 minutes on 3 September 2015 as Bulgaria lost 0–1 to Norway in Sofia.

Chochev scored his first goal with the national team on June 3, 2016 during the 2016 Kirin Cup in a 2–7 defeat to Japan.

On 31 August 2017, Chochev scored the winning goal for the 3–2 win over Sweden.

On 22 March 2019, Chochev received a heavy injury in a qualification match against Montenegro.

Honours
Best midfielder in Bulgarian football for 2021

Career statistics

Club

International

As of match played 5 September 2021. Bulgaria score listed first, score column indicates score after each Chochev goal.

References

External links

Player Profile at UEFA

1993 births
Living people
Bulgarian footballers
Bulgaria under-21 international footballers
Bulgaria international footballers
Bulgarian expatriate footballers
FC Chavdar Etropole players
PFC CSKA Sofia players
Palermo F.C. players
Delfino Pescara 1936 players
FC CSKA 1948 Sofia players
First Professional Football League (Bulgaria) players
Serie A players
Serie B players
Association football midfielders
Expatriate footballers in Italy
Sportspeople from Pleven